A bearing rein, known today as an overcheck or a checkrein, is a piece of horse tack that runs from a point on the horse's back, over the head, to a bit.  It is used to prevent the horse from lowering its head beyond a fixed point.  A variation called a side check passes beside the ears through loops at the top of the bridle cheekpieces.

It can be attached to the surcingle of a horse harness, or to the harness saddle.

An overcheck or bearing rein shares some function with side reins, draw reins, and the de Gogue, and has the opposite function to a chambon and martingale.   It can be attached to the same bit as the reins, or to a second, separate bit.

Use

The modern overcheck is often a necessary piece of safety equipment for certain types of harness and is an aid to the driver in keeping a horse's head properly positioned.

An overcheck has a practical purpose; if a horse lowers its head too far when in harness, particularly if moving quickly, it can catch the bridle on the shafts of the carriage or wagon, risking an accident.  Properly adjusted and when used for a limited period of time, an overcheck does not significantly impede the motion of the horse or cause discomfort.  If too tight, however, an overcheck rein can be uncomfortable because it puts strain on the neck muscles and ligaments.  On a hard-working draft horse, it generally is not used at all, as it puts the animal off balance by preventing it from lowering its head when trying to pull significant weight.  A horse pulling weight normally lowers and extends its neck in order to distribute the load. If an overcheck is inappropriately used, or used for too long a period, spinal strain resulting in neck or back injury can occur.

The overcheck is also used today in some equestrian riding activities, and for certain types of horse training.  In particular, it is used on certain saddle seat horses while on the longe line as part of a bitting rig that assists the horse in learning the proper high set head position for competition that also emphasizes high knee action.  While not normally used by a rider in the saddle, it is common in some places to put an overcheck on ponies when being ridden by very young riders in order to prevent the pony from putting its head down and grazing while being ridden, an act of disobedience that a small child often lacks the physical strength to prevent.

The overcheck is generally not used to train dressage horses, because it can lead to the horse traveling with a hollow frame, the opposite of the rounded frame encouraged in dressage.  A device that looks similar, the chambon, is sometimes used in training of dressage horses.  However, the chambon encourages the horse to lower, not raise, its head.  The Gogue is a related training tool.

History
In the 18th and 19th centuries, the overcheck, then called a "bearing rein," was commonly used on stylish carriage horses to keep their heads up, at times to an extreme degree, depending on the fashion of various periods.  Today it is used primarily for horse show or exhibition use, particularly in the schooling and showing of fine harness horses and certain types of carriage horses.

Historically, improper use and overuse created chronic problems with the spine and back that in some cases made certain horses useless as working animals. The fashion extremes of the 18th and 19th centuries at times tightened a bearing rein to the degree that it made breathing difficult.  This is touched on in the novel Black Beauty.  The "Anti-Bearing Rein Association" was formed to try and stop the practice of using such reins. About that time, the cause was also taken up by the Canadian Society of Cruelty to Animals

The term bearing rein is derived from the definition of "bearing" which means "the manner in which one bears or conducts one's self; mien; behavior; carriage." The reference suggested that high head carriage was a sign of nobility or pride.  However, 19th century critics of the bearing rein applied a pejorative meaning to the word, meaning "patient endurance; suffering without complaint".  Modern harness trainers prefer the more accurate terminology "overcheck" and "check rein".

Related equipment
Related types of checkrein often used in conjunction with an overcheck are side reins, a pair of reins which run simply from the bit to a surcingle or saddle, intended to keep the horse's head tucked in.  Side reins are a very common training tool for working horses on the  longe, also considered standard safety equipment in the sport of equestrian vaulting, but rarely if ever are used by a mounted rider.

See also
Driving (horse)
Horse harness
Bitting rig
Longeing

References

Reins